The 1968 U.S. Women's Open was the 23rd U.S. Women's Open, held July 4–7 at Moselem Springs Golf Club in Fleetwood, Pennsylvania, northeast of Reading.

Susie Maxwell Berning won the first of her three U.S. Women's Open titles, three shots ahead of runner-up Mickey Wright, a four-time champion. It was the second of four major titles for Berning, a newlywed of less than two months. She led wire-to-wire and bogeyed the final three holes.

Defending champion Catherine Lacoste, still an amateur, finished thirteen strokes back, tied for thirteenth place.

Past champions in the field

Source:

Final leaderboard
Sunday, July 7, 1968

Source:

References

External links
Golf Observer final leaderboard
U.S. Women's Open Golf Championship
U.S. Women's Open – past champions – 1968
Moselem Springs Golf Club

U.S. Women's Open
Golf in Pennsylvania
Sports competitions in Pennsylvania
U.S. Women's Open
U.S. Women's Open
U.S. Women's Open
U.S. Women's Open
Women's sports in Pennsylvania